The 2018 Lao Premier League is the 29th season of the Lao Premier League. The season started on 24 February 2018.

Teams 
A total of 8 teams participated in the 2018 Lao League season, 1 promoted from the previous season of Lao Division 1 League. 6 teams withdrew from the league, including defending champions.

Stadia
Note: Table lists in alphabetical order.

League table

References

External links
Lao Premier League website

Laos
Lao Premier League seasons